Sani Bheri River, a tributary of the Karnali River, starts from the southern slopes of Dhaulagiri range. Sani Bheri River and Thuli Bheri River join at Rimnaghat to form the main Bheri River.

References

Rivers of Karnali Province